This is a following list of the MTV Movie Award winners for Most Desirable Female. This award was last given out in
1996, along with its counterpart, Most Desirable Male.

MTV Movie & TV Awards